Ermir Strati (born 11 November 1983 in Vlorë) is an Albanian retired football player. He can play as either a defender or midfielder. He currently works at Norwegian club IK Grand Bodø.

Club career
He has played for Flamurtari Vlorë in the Albanian Superliga and KF Vlora. At KF Vlora he was both football player and the head coach. As of 2013, he played for the Norwegian amateur club Fortuna FK Oslo where he later became coach and director of sports.

Honours

Flamurtari 
 Kupa e shqipërisë (1): 2008–09
 Kupa Birra Norga (1): 2007
 Kupa Pavarësia (1): 2009
 Kupa Mbarëkombëtare (1): 2009

References

External links
 Profile - FSHF

1983 births
Living people
Footballers from Vlorë
Albanian footballers
Association football midfielders
Association football defenders
Flamurtari Vlorë players
KF Vlora players
Luftëtari Gjirokastër players
Kategoria Superiore players
Kategoria e Parë players
Albanian expatriate footballers
Expatriate footballers in Norway
Albanian expatriate sportspeople in Norway
Albanian football managers